USS Rasher (SS/SSR/AGSS/IXSS-269), a , was a ship of the United States Navy named for the rasher, or vermilion rockfish, a fish found along the California coast.

Construction and commissioning
Rasher, a fleet submarine, was laid down on 4 May 1942 by Manitowoc Shipbuilding Company at Manitowoc, Wisconsin; launched 20 December 1942, sponsored by Mrs. G. C. Weaver; and commissioned 8 June 1943, Commander E. S. Hutchinson in command. Admiral Charles A. Lockwood had earlier relieved Hutchinson of command of the submarine  for lacking aggressiveness.

Service history
Following builder's trials in Lake Michigan, Rasher was decommissioned and towed down the Mississippi on a floating drydock. After recommissioning and fitting out in New Orleans, the new submarine trained in the Bay of Panama, departed Balboa 8 August 1943, and arrived at Brisbane, Australia, on 11 September.

First war patrol, September – November 1943 
On her first war patrol, 24 September through 24 November 1943, Rasher operated in the Makassar Strait–Celebes Sea area, and sank the passenger-cargo ship Kogane Maru in a submerged attack at dawn on 9 October. Four days later, off Ambon Harbor, she spotted a convoy of four merchantmen escorted by two destroyers and a "Pete" seaplane. She fired two salvoes of three torpedoes each, then crash dived to avoid the destroyers and bombs from the scout plane. Freighter Kenkoku Maru broke up and sank, while the escorts struck back in a vigorous but vain counterattack.

On the afternoon of 31 October, while patrolling the shipping lanes off the Borneo coast, Rasher commenced trailing tanker Koryo Maru, but because of a patrolling float plane, was unable to attack until night. Rasher then surfaced, attacked and sent the tanker to the bottom after a thunderous explosion of exploding torpedoes and gasoline.

The submarine's next victim was tanker Tango Maru which lost her stern to a spread of three torpedoes on the afternoon of 8 November. Rasher escaped the escorts by diving deep and silently slipping away. A midnight attack on a second convoy in the Makassar Strait off Mangkalihat Peninsula resulted in a hit on a tanker, but vigorous countermeasures by enemy destroyers prevented any assessment of damage. Rasher escaped the enemy surface craft and, her torpedoes expended, headed home. Rasher sustained no damage, and arrived at Fremantle on 24 November 1943.

Hutchinson had cleared his record on Grampus with the sinkings and was promoted to command a submarine division.

Second war patrol, December 1943 – January 1944 
Command of Rasher was given to Willard Ross Laughon, former commanding officer of R-1 in the Atlantic. Following refit, Rasher commenced her second war patrol on 19 December 1943 and hunted Japanese shipping in the South China Sea off Borneo. When she attacked a three-tanker convoy on the night of 4 January 1944, her first torpedo exploded prematurely. A melee ensued, with tankers scattering and escorts racing about, firing in all directions. Rasher fired at a second target while submerged, and heard explosions, but was unable to confirm a sinking. She pursued the third tanker, firing a spread of four torpedoes early on the morning of 5 January 1944. A mushroom-shaped fire rose as the last two torpedoes struck, and Kiyo Maru sank, leaving an oil slick and scattered debris. During the patrol, Rasher planted mines off the approaches to Saigon harbor. Prematurely exploding torpedoes and vigilant escorts frustrated her attacks on convoys on 11 January and 17 January. A week later she returned to Fremantle.

Third and fourth war patrols, February – June 1944 
Rasher'''s third war patrol from 19 February to 4 April 1944, was conducted in the Java Sea–Celebes Sea area. On 25 February she attacked a Japanese convoy off Bali, and sank the cargo ships Tango Maru, killing 3,500 Javanese laborers (Romusha) and prisoners-of-war and Ryusei Maru, killing 5,000 Imperial Japanese Army soldiers. Then, after transiting Makassar Strait into the Celebes Sea, she destroyed the cargo ship Nattai Maru on 3 March.

Rasher′s watch officer described Ro-112 as a black submarine of the "Ro-51 class." At 11:49, Rasher fired four Mark 14 Mod 3 torpedoes at Ro-112, but Ro-112 turned to port and evaded them. En route home, however, Rasher met the 2,750-ton freighter Nichinan Maru on 27 March and sank her.Rasher returned to the Makassar Strait-Celebes Sea area for her fourth patrol, from 30 April to 23 June 1944. On 11 May, she torpedoed and sank the freighter Choi Maru. Next to go down were the converted gunboat Anshu Maru on 29 May and the tanker Shioya Maru in the Celebes Sea off Manado on 8 June. On 14 June, the cargo ship Koan Maru went to the bottom, after taking a spread of torpedoes aft and capsizing.

 Fifth war patrol, 22 July – 3 September 1944 
Commander Henry G. Munson relieved Commander Laughon as commanding officer of Rasher.

Thirty miles south of Scarborough Shoal at 2255 5 August, Rasher launched a spread of six bow torpedoes at the largest ship in a three-ship convoy. Diving to avoid being rammed, Rasher's crew counted five hits and heard the sounds of a ship breaking up as the army cargo ship Shiroganesan Maru went down.Rasher observed nine successive aircraft contacts to the north on the afternoon of 18 August and deduced these were air patrols for an important convoy. That dark, rainy night Rashers radar picked up a  convoy of thirteen ships protected by six escorts. The escorts fired wildly and laid depth charge patterns astern of Rasher. In a second surfaced approach to  Rasher launched a spread of six bow torpedoes. Three torpedoes hit and sank the 17,000 ton transport Teia Maru, killing 2,665 Japanese soldiers, and a fourth torpedo was heard exploding at a timed range of 3900 yards. Rasher swung hard left to launch four stern torpedoes at 2214. Three torpedoes hit and sank the 20,000 ton carrier , which was escorting the convoy, and the fourth torpedo was heard exploding on a more distant ship.

Rasher pulled away to reload torpedo tubes and the convoy split into two groups. Rasher followed the group moving northwest while Bluefish intercepted the remaining ships continuing southwesterly and sank two tankers. The fourth torpedo was heard exploding on a more distant ship. Rasher then swung hard right to launch two stern torpedoes.

Rasher counted sixteen detonations from the eighteen torpedoes fired on 18 August and five detonations for the six fired on 5 August.  With all torpedoes expended, Rasher set course for Midway.  Munson was called into a secret conference at Midway to compare his observations with decrypted Japanese message traffic.  Postwar accounting verified Rasher had sunk the highest tonnage of any World War II U.S. submarine patrol to that date.  That record would be exceeded only once, when  sank the Japanese aircraft carrier Shinano three months later.  Rasher proceeded to San Francisco via Hawaii for overhaul at Hunter's Point Naval Shipyard on 11 September. She was given a new 5-inch deck gun, ST radar, and many other upgrades.

 Sixth, seventh, and eighth war patrols, January – August 1945 
Benjamin Ernest Adams Jr. replaced Munson for the sixth war patrol. Rasher departed San Francisco on 20 December 1944, arriving at Midway via Pearl Harbor in early January 1945. Rasher attacked a pair of ships on 15 February but missed, and approached a convoy the next day but was unable to get in position to attack. A later attack on another convoy also ended in misses. No other suitable targets were found, only small patrol craft, hospital ships, and ubiquitous patrol aircraft. The patrol ended on 16 March 1945 at Guam.

Charles Derick Nace replaced Adams for the seventh and eighth patrols. Rasher's seventh patrol, 17 April to 29 May 1945, was little more rewarding than the sixth. On lifeguard station off Honshū, she riddled two small craft with gunfire. No aircraft came down in her area, and she returned to Midway on 29 May.

Rasher departed Midway 23 June 1945 to take lifeguard station off southern Formosa. No Allied planes were downed in her area before orders arrived to proceed to the Gulf of Siam. While she was en route the war ended, and Rasher returned to the Philippines. She departed Subic Bay on 31 August arriving New York on 6 October, via Pearl Harbor and the Panama Canal. Following deactivation overhaul, she was decommissioned 22 June 1946 and was placed in the Atlantic Reserve Fleet at New London, Connecticut.

Rasher was credited with sinking 99,901 tons of Japanese shipping, the third highest total for US submarines in World War II. However, a Japanese destroyer credited as sunk by sister ship  is given a name that never existed and may have been a case of mistaken identity.  If the tonnage credited for this ship is removed from the record of Flasher, then Rasher becomes the second highest-scoring US submarine for tonnage.

 Service as radar picket submarine, 1953–1960 
She was placed in commission in reserve at Philadelphia Naval Shipyard 14 December 1951, Lt. V. D. Ely in command. After being reclassified as a radar picket submarine, SSR-269, she commenced conversion which continued after she decommissioned 28 May 1952. After extensive hull and interior alterations at Philadelphia Navy Yard, she was recommissioned 22 July 1953, Lt. Comdr. R. W. Stecher in command. She departed New London on 12 November, arriving San Diego 17 December via Guantanamo Bay and the Panama Canal.

The following two years were spent off the west coast in operations from Washington state to Acapulco. On 4 January 1956, she deployed to the 7th Fleet, where she operated with U.S. and SEATO naval units. She returned to San Diego 3 July 1956. Prior to and following a second WestPac deployment from 4 March to 4 September 1958, SSR-269 served in Fleet exercises as an early warning ship, and in ASW training operations.

On 28 December 1959, Rasher departed the continental United States for the Far East. While attached to the 7th Fleet, she participated in exercise "Blue Star", a large-scale American-Nationalist Chinese amphibious exercise. In May 1960, she took part in the Black Ship Festival at Shimoda, Japan, commemorating Commodore Matthew C. Perry's landing. She returned to San Diego on 20 June 1960.

 Vietnam War service 

Rasher was reclassified as an auxiliary submarine, AGSS-269, on 1 July 1960, with conversion being accomplished at Mare Island Naval Shipyard. Involved in maintaining fleet readiness until mid-August 1962 when she deployed to WestPac, Rasher continued to exhibit her usual high standards of performance. She returned to San Diego on 15 February 1963, and was overhauled that summer.

During the next year, AGSS-269 was engaged in strike exercises involving other American and Canadian ships. Her next deployment, beginning on 3 August 1964, involved support of 7th Fleet operations off Vietnam, as well as ASW exercises with SEATO allies.

After returning to San Diego on 5 February 1965, she had ASW and amphibious training. Her next WestPac deployment, from 3 January to 17 July 1966, included amphibious and ASW training support for Republic of Korea, Nationalist Chinese, and Thai units, as well as operations with the 7th Fleet off Vietnam.

Rasher spent the remainder of her commissioned career providing training services off the coast of California to UDT and ASW units.

Decommissioning and disposal
Rasher was decommissioned 27 May 1967, and later was reclassified "unclassified miscellaneous submarine" IXSS-269',  was towed to Portland, Oregon, where she served as a training submarine for Naval reservists until struck from the Navy List, 20 December 1971.

Honors and awards

  Presidential Unit Citation for outstanding performance in combat during World War II patrols 1, 3, 4, and 5.
  Asiatic-Pacific Campaign Medal with seven battle stars for World War II service
  Vietnam Service Medal with two service stars for Vietnam War service

See also
List of most successful American submarines in World War II

 References 
Citations

Bibliography
 Hinman, Charles R., and Douglas E. Campbell. The Submarine Has No Friends: Friendly Fire Incidents Involving U.S. Submarines During World War II. Syneca Research Group, Inc., 2019. .

Further reading
 Sasgen, Peter. 1995. Red Scorpion: The War Patrols of the USS Rasher.'' Pocket Star Books.  (The author's father served on all eight of the Rasher's patrols during World War II)

External links 

navsource.org: USS Rasher

 

Gato-class submarines
World War II submarines of the United States
Cold War submarines of the United States
Vietnam War submarines of the United States
Ships built in Manitowoc, Wisconsin
1942 ships
Maritime incidents in November 1943
Friendly fire incidents of World War II